Bread soup is a simple soup that mainly consists of stale bread. Variations exist in many countries, and it is often eaten during Lent.  Both brown and white bread may be used.

The basis for bread soup is traditionally either meat soup or vegetable broth. Less often it is made with fish broth. To prepare the dish, the bread is either cut into pieces and put directly into the broth, or it is cooked with onions and spices in a broth and then pureed.

Some versions add bacon, egg and cream, others liver sausage or blood sausage. A common version of the dish is prepared from the broth remaining from the steeping of sausage during home butchering of pigs. The soup is then traditionally seasoned with marjoram. An Italian variation, millefanti, also uses egg and Parmesan cheese. Some fine variations contain wine. Other, more rustic, versions contain malt or beer.

Brewis

Brewis is a type of bread soup associated with the cuisine of North England. Originally a term for bread soaked in meat drippings, brewis came to be used for broths thickened with bread (or sometimes oatmeal). A similar dish in the cuisine of New England was made by softening rye bread or Boston brown bread with milk and maple syrup.

Varieties
 Açorda in Portuguese cuisine 
 Acquacotta, also known as pancotto
 Brotsuppe in German cuisine
 Ollebrod in Danish cuisine
 Pappa al pomodoro
 Ribollita in Italian cuisine
 Sopa de ajo in Spanish cuisine
 Soup Pain in Haitian cuisine
 Tyurya in Russian cuisine
 Wodzianka in Polish cuisine (Silesia and Central Poland)
 Velija Loksy in Slovakian cuisine
 Paomo in Chinese cuisine

See also
 List of bread dishes
 List of soups

References

External links
 Variations of German bread soups
 Austrian bread soup with pureed brown bread

Bavarian cuisine
Bread soups
German soups